Marvin A. Blyden is a politician and senator of the Legislature of the Virgin Islands, since 2015.  On September 25, 2021, he was cited for not following Covid quarantine regulations.

References 

|-

1962 births
21st-century American politicians
Democratic Party of the Virgin Islands politicians
Living people
Senators of the Legislature of the United States Virgin Islands